Kim Jae-hoon (born 21 February 1988) is a South Korean footballer who plays as a defender for Chungju Hummel in the K League Challenge.

External links 

1988 births
Living people
Association football defenders
South Korean footballers
Jeonnam Dragons players
Daejeon Hana Citizen FC players
Gangneung City FC players
Chungju Hummel FC players
K League 1 players
Korea National League players
K League 2 players
K3 League players
Konkuk University alumni